Mannix Joyce (Irish: Mainchín Seoighe, 1924 – 3 July 2006) was an Irish local historian and writer, known particularly for his publications on County Limerick.

He was born in Tankardstown, Kilmallock, County Limerick. In 1941 he started work with Limerick County Council, where he remained all his life, mainly in the position of Information Officer. He was a prolific contributor to the Limerick Leader newspaper; his first article appeared in 1944 and his column (under the pen-name An Mangaire Súgach, the Merry Peddlar) continued unbroken until 2002.

He was awarded an honorary doctorate by the National University of Ireland in 1990.

Select works
 Maríodh Sean South, 1964
 Cois Maighe na gCaor, 1965
 Dromin Athlacca (1978)
 A Local History of Bruree,
 The Story of Kilmallock (1987)
 A Portrait of Limerick (1982)
 County Limerick People and Places (1993)
 The Joyce Brothers of Glenosheen
 The Irish Quotation Book
 Staker Wallis: His Life and Times and Death (1994)

References

1924 births
2006 deaths
Writers from County Limerick
20th-century Irish historians